Babloo is a Telugu romantic action film released in 2011 directed by G. Ravicharan Reddy. It was produced by Smt. Gudur Jhansirani under SPJ Creations banner. Manotej and Aditi Sharma appeared in lead roles. This film is dubbed into Hindi as Ek Aur Hero: The Dashing.

Plot
Bablu is a story of young boy Babloo (Manotej), who is a happy-go-lucky guy studying in college, where he falls in love with Aditi Sharma, and after some instance their family gets some problems and rest of the story deals with how Babloo rescues their family problems with the help of Aditi Sharma.

Cast
Manotej as Babloo
Aditi Sharma
Mukul Dev
Ahuti Prasad
Chalapathi Rao
Rao Ramesh
Raghu Babu
Kondavalasa
Venu Madhav
M. S. Narayana
Geeta Singh
Surekha Vani
Satya Krishna

Soundtrack

Release
The film was released on 3 June 2011.

Reception 
A critic from Filmibeat wrote that "As a whole, those who watch the film can simply say that amateurs have made a vain attempt to make the film and has delivered a dud".

References

2011 films
2010s Telugu-language films
Indian romantic action films
2011 action films